Since the inception of the European Cup in 1955, there have been many meetings in UEFA club competitions between football teams from each part of the United Kingdom – England, Northern Ireland, Scotland and Wales.

Overview
In addition to the rivalry between the national sides, clubs from the English and Scottish league systems have also met on numerous occasions in the various European club competitions. These matches are frequently described by the media as being a "Battle of Britain", irrespective of the clubs involved.

There has never been a European final between an English and a Scottish club, and two Scottish clubs have never faced off in European tournaments at any stage; the closest this came to occurring was in the 1965–66 Inter-Cities Fairs Cup when Hearts lost a playoff to Zaragoza with Dunfermline already drawn to meet the winners in the next round, and in the same competition two years later when, knowing Dundee would be the next opponent, Rangers were eliminated by eventual winners Leeds United.

Clubs from England, the second most successful nation on the continent with 35 major wins in the four main competitions (behind Spain with 41) have played each other on 23 occasions (every two-legged tie or pair of home-and-away group matches counting as one) including in five finals: the 1972 UEFA Cup Final, the 2008 UEFA Champions League Final, the 2019 UEFA Europa League Final, the 2019 UEFA Champions League Final and the 2021 UEFA Champions League Final; the all-English pairings in 2019 was the first time a single nation had provided all four finalists since the Cup Winners' Cup was abolished (there were four Italian finalists in 1990 from six places available).

Despite the high number of wins by English clubs in the relevant competitions, there had never been an all-English or all-British UEFA Super Cup match (by contrast there were four all-Spanish and two all-Italian meetings in the event) until 2019, when it became a certainty due to the presence of four finalists.

There were no European ties involving English clubs during the period of their ban following the Heysel Stadium disaster in 1985.

European Cup/Champions League
Celtic and Leeds United met in the semi-final of the 1970 European Cup, which was the first contest to be popularly described as a "Battle of Britain". Celtic won the first leg at Elland Road 1–0, and the second leg was played at Hampden Park to allow a bigger crowd to attend than could be held at Celtic Park, with the resultant attendance of 136,505 the largest ever crowd for a European match. Billy Bremner opened the scoring early on to level the aggregate score, but Celtic came back to win the match 2–1 and the tie 3–1.

There was only one all-English tie under the old knockout format among four British ties overall; this was in 1978 when the two-time holders Liverpool were beaten in the opening round by Nottingham Forest, who had qualified for the competition for the first time and went on to win the trophy; they retained it the following year, before Liverpool won again in 1981 (beating Scottish title holders Aberdeen en route). Aston Villa enjoyed their own winning debut season in the 1981–82 edition to complete a sequence of six consecutive wins for English clubs.

Rangers defeated Leeds United home and away to qualify for the first Champions League group stage in 1992–93. In the early 21st century, after the entry criteria of the premier competition was expanded to include several clubs from each of the leading nations, four Champions League semi-finals between English clubs took place, three pairing Liverpool against Chelsea, plus the final in 2008 between Chelsea and Manchester United.

Although clubs from the same association cannot be drawn in the same group, an exception was made for 2005–06. As title holders Liverpool did not qualify for the Champions League through their league position, a compromise was made by UEFA to allow them to take part in the competition from the first qualifying round and without "association protection", they were eventually paired with Chelsea in the group stage.

Celtic and Manchester United were drawn together twice in the Champions League group phase in quick succession, in 2006–07 and 2008–09, while Arsenal beat Celtic 5–1 on aggregate in the 2009–10 qualifiers. Manchester United and Rangers met in the 2010–11 Champions League, with the match at Old Trafford finishing goalless. Roddy Forsyth, writing in The Daily Telegraph, commented that the growing financial disparity between the two leagues was reflected in the below capacity attendance, the defensive tactics used by Rangers, and the weakened team selection by United. In total, British teams have been drawn together 25 times since the advent of the new format in 1992. The most recent competitive meeting of clubs from England and Scotland was between Celtic and Manchester City in the 2016–17 UEFA Champions League. Manchester City were defeated by an English opponent, Liverpool, in the quarter-finals of the 2017–18 competition.

2018–19 provided another all-English quarter-final (Tottenham Hotspur overcoming Manchester City in dramatic circumstances) followed by the final itself, where Liverpool defeated Tottenham 2–0 to win their sixth European Cup. Two years later in the 2020–21 season, Manchester City reached their first ever Champions League final, where they would face Chelsea to set up the third ever all-English UCL final. Chelsea won the match 1–0 to secure their second Champions League title.

UEFA Cup/Europa League
There have been numerous ties between British clubs in the secondary competitions – 23 in the UEFA Cup, sixteen in the extinct tournament considered to be its predecessor, the Inter-Cities Fairs Cup, and thirteen in the defunct UEFA Cup Winners' Cup. Leeds' route to glory in the 1967–68 Fairs Cup featured three successive wins over Scottish opponents. Celtic lost on the away goals rule to Liverpool in the 1997–98 UEFA Cup, but they beat Blackburn Rovers and Liverpool on their run to the 2003 UEFA Cup Final. Hearts suffered a record defeat against Tottenham Hotspur in the 2011–12 UEFA Europa League, but performed more creditably against Liverpool in 2012–13.

Apart from the 1972 UEFA Cup Final won by Tottenham over Wolverhampton Wanderers, and the 1972–73 UEFA Cup Semi-final when Liverpool knocked out the holders, Tottenham on away goals, the only all-English tie in more than four decades of the UEFA Cup/Europa League up until 2019 took place in 2016, when arch-rivals Liverpool and Manchester United met; the Merseyside club progressed and were eventually runners-up in the competition.

In the 2020–21 season, qualifying round matches (including all-UK ties in successive rounds featuring Motherwell against Glentoran then Coleraine) were played over one leg behind closed doors due to the COVID-19 pandemic.

Historic competitions
Matches between English and Scottish club sides in the late 19th century were big events, such as the meeting in 1895 of English league champions Sunderland and Scottish league champions Hearts in a game grandly described as the Championship of the World.

There have also been a number of other competitions between English and Scottish clubs. Before European competition started in 1955, the Coronation Cup was staged in 1953, to mark the coronation of Queen Elizabeth II. Four prominent clubs from each country participated in a knockout tournament, with Celtic and Hibernian defeating two English clubs each to reach the final, which Celtic won 2–0 at Hampden. A similar competition called the Empire Exhibition Trophy was staged in 1938, with Celtic defeating Everton 1–0 in the final at Ibrox. Back in 1902, the four-team British League Cup was staged in Glasgow, with both Rangers and Celtic defeating their English opponents to set up a local final, won by Celtic 3–2 (this was before the Old Firm term came into use but was one of several fixtures between the sides in the early 1900s which led to its introduction due to the frequency of their meetings).

In the 1970s, American oil giant Texaco sponsored the Texaco Cup, which was a knockout competition for clubs that had failed to qualify for the main European competitions. Interest in the competition soon waned, however, and Texaco withdrew their sponsorship after the 1974–75 season. The competition continued for a few years in the form of the Anglo-Scottish Cup, but it was discontinued in 1981. Following the English ban from Europe after Heysel, the Dubai Champions Cup was played between the English and Scottish champions for three seasons (at the start of 1986–87 and 1987–88 and towards the end of 1988–89).

Wales
Welsh sides did not take part in the Champions League until the 1993–94 season, following the creation of the Welsh Premier League, and both the champions and runners-up entered the UEFA Cup for the first time in the 1994–95 season as UEFA made the champions of smaller nations — including Northern Ireland — compete in the UEFA Cup for a three-year period.

Although the Welsh teams in the English league system were entitled to enter the Cup Winners' Cup by winning the Welsh Cup until 1995 and qualified for the competition 31 times between them, they were drawn against another British club on just two occasions — Newport County v Crusaders in 1980 and Wrexham v Manchester United in 1990.

Scottish Challenge Cup
In 2016, the Scottish Challenge Cup, normally for Scottish Professional Football League clubs outside the Premiership, invited two teams from Wales and Northern Ireland to take part, and the following year extended entry to two clubs from the Republic of Ireland. (clubs from the NIFL Premiership and the League of Ireland Premier Division had also competed against each other in the Setanta Cup, last played in 2014). Welsh club The New Saints progressed to the semi-final in the 2016–17 season. They repeated the feat in 2017–18, being joined by Northern Irish club Crusaders. The results of ties between clubs from different countries are not included here.

For the 2018–19 edition, two English National League clubs were invited to take part in the competition, and the first non-Scottish team reached the final – Connah's Quay Nomads of Wales, who beat Edinburgh City on penalties.

UEFA Champions League/European Champion Clubs' Cup

UEFA Super Cup

UEFA Europa League/UEFA Cup

UEFA Europa Conference League

Inter-Cities Fairs Cup

UEFA Cup Winners' Cup

Results tables
The statistics from all matches played by clubs of each nation against the others is shown below.

England
England is the only nation whose teams have played against each other, in 22 ties (41 matches, three being single-game finals) across four competitions.

Northern Ireland

Scotland

Wales

British overseas territories

Since 2013, the Gibraltar Football Association has been a member of UEFA enabling them to enter team into UEFA competitions representing Gibraltar, a British overseas territory. The first tie between a team from Gibraltar and a side from the United Kingdom was a second qualifying round Champions League tie between Celtic, of Scotland, and Lincoln Red Imps; Celtic won the tie 3–1 on aggregate after a shock 1–0 loss in the first leg.

The first meeting between a Gibraltarian and a Welsh side was played in the first qualifying round of the Champions League between Europa and The New Saints in 2017; TNS played Lincoln Red Imps in the second qualifying round of the Europa League in 2018.

UEFA Champions League

UEFA Europa League

UEFA Europa Conference League

Results table

See also
 Anglo-Scottish Cup
 Football World Championship
 Texaco Cup
 British League Cup, 1902, held in Glasgow
 Empire Exhibition Trophy, 1938, held in Glasgow
 Coronation Cup (football), 1953, held in Glasgow
 List of football matches between British national teams
 English football clubs in international competitions
 Northern Irish football clubs in European competitions
 Scottish football clubs in international competitions
 Welsh football clubs in European competitions

References

External links
Matches between English and Scottish Clubs at Rec.Sport.Soccer Statistics Foundation (up to 2005)

+
+
History of football in England
History of football in Scotland

Football in Gibraltar
Association football in Northern Ireland